

Wolfgang von Kluge (5 May 1892 – 30 October 1976) served in both world wars. He rose to the rank of Generalleutnant in the Wehrmacht by 1943, commanding several divisions. He was commander of "Fortress Dunkirk" between July and September 1944. He was a recipient of the Knight's Cross of the Iron Cross of Nazi Germany. 

He was the younger brother of Gunther von Kluge (1882-1944).

Awards and decorations

 Knight's Cross of the Iron Cross on 29 August 1943 as Generalleutnant and commander of 292. Infanterie-Division

References

Citations

Bibliography

  

1892 births
1976 deaths
Military personnel from Szczecin
People from the Province of Pomerania
Lieutenant generals of the German Army (Wehrmacht)
German Army personnel of World War I
Prussian Army personnel
Recipients of the clasp to the Iron Cross, 1st class
Recipients of the Gold German Cross
Recipients of the Knight's Cross of the Iron Cross
Reichswehr personnel
German Army generals of World War II